Claus Westermann (7 October 1909 – 11 June 2000) was a German Protestant Old Testament scholar. He taught at the University of Heidelberg from 1958 to 1978.

Born to African missionaries, he finished his studies in 1933 and he became a pastor.  During his theological studies he  started studying the Old Testament, and became particularly interested in the content of the Psalms. During the Nazi regime he served in the German army for five years where he was a translator on the Russian front. After the war Westermann started preaching again and also went to teach Old Testament at Heidelberg, where he would continue to teach for twenty years with colleagues such as Gerhard von Rad, Hans Walter Wolff, and Rolf Rendtorff.

Westermann is considered one of the premier Old Testament scholars of the twentieth century. Particularly notable among his scholarship is his lengthy and comprehensive commentary on the Book of Genesis, especially the volume covering Genesis 1-11.

Select Publications of Westermann
 Some works that have been translated into English
 A Thousand Years and a Day: Our Time in the Old Testament German orig. 1957 (English translation, 1962)
 Basic Forms of Prophetic Speech, German orig. 1960 (English translation by Hugh Clayton White, 1967)
 Handbook to the Old Testament German orig. (English translation by Robert Boyd, 1969)
 Creation German orig. 1971 (English translation by John J. Scullion, 1974)
 The Psalms: Structure, Content and Message German orig. (English translation, 1980)
 Elements of Old Testament Theology German orig. (English translation, 1982)
 Genesis 1 - 11, German orig. 1972 (English translation by John J. Scullion, 1984)
 Genesis 12 - 36, German orig. 1981 (English translation by John J. Scullion, 1985)
 Genesis 37 - 50, German orig. 1982 (English translation by John J. Scullion, 1986)
 The Living Psalms German orig. (English translation by J. R. Porter, 1989)
 The Gospel of John: In the Light of the Old Testament, German orig. 1994 (English translation by Siegfried S. Schatzmann, 1998)

References
 Notes

 Further reading
 
 
 

1909 births
2000 deaths
20th-century German Protestant theologians
German Lutheran theologians
German biblical scholars
Old Testament scholars
German male non-fiction writers
Lutheran biblical scholars
20th-century Lutherans